Suraj Karkera (born 14 October 1995) is an Indian field hockey player who plays as a goalkeeper.

Life and career
Karkera was born on 14 October 1995 in Bombay (now Mumbai). He did his schooling at Children's Academy in Malad and is pursuing a degree in commerce from the Rizvi College, as of 2017.

Karkera made his debut for the Indian junior team in 2015 and was a regular member of the team on several tours. He made his senior team debut the following year and was part of India's gold-medal winning squad at the 2017 Asia Cup. He was named the Goalkeeper of the Tournament at the 2021 Asian Champions Trophy where his team won the bronze medal.

References

External links
Suraj Karkera at Hockey India

1995 births
Living people
Field hockey players from Mumbai
Indian male field hockey players
Male field hockey goalkeepers
Field hockey players at the 2018 Commonwealth Games
Commonwealth Games competitors for India